Yarımkaya is a village in the Ovacık District, Tunceli Province, Turkey. The village is populated by Kurds of the Kalan tribe and had a population of 53 in 2021.

The hamlets of Aliler, Celaller, Cevizlik, Çağlayan, Çalış, Çürük, Demirtaş, Gülhan and Konak are attached to the village.

References 

Kurdish settlements in Tunceli Province
Villages in Ovacık District